Park Kyung-suk is a South Korean taekwondo practitioner.

She won a silver medal in lightweight at the 1993 World Taekwondo Championships in New York City, and a gold medal at the 1995 World Taekwondo Championships in Manila.

References

External links

Year of birth missing (living people)
Living people
South Korean female taekwondo practitioners
World Taekwondo Championships medalists
20th-century South Korean women